The Ireland cricket team represents all of Ireland in international cricket. The Irish Cricket Union, operating under the brand Cricket Ireland, is the sport's governing body in Ireland, and they organise the international team.

Ireland participate in all three major forms of the international game: Test, One-Day International (ODI) and Twenty20 International (T20I) matches. They are the 11th Full Member of the International Cricket Council (ICC), and the second Full Member from Europe, having been awarded Test status, along with Afghanistan, on 22 June 2017.

Cricket was introduced to Ireland in the 19th century, and the first match played by an Ireland team was in 1855. Ireland toured Canada and the United States in the late 19th century, and occasionally hosted matches against touring sides. Ireland's most significant international rivalry, with the Scotland national cricket team, was established when the teams first played each other in 1888. Ireland's maiden first-class match was played in 1902.

Ireland were elected to Associate membership of the ICC in 1993, but played their first full ODI in 2006 against England in the build-up to the 2007 ICC Cricket World Cup, their first successful qualification. At that tournament, a series of eye-catching results against Full Members, including a draw against Zimbabwe, and wins against Pakistan and Bangladesh confirmed Ireland's ODI status after the competition. Since then, they have gone on to play 176 ODIs, resulting in 74 victories, 89 defeats, 10 no results, and 3 ties. Contracts for players were introduced in 2009, marking the transition to becoming a professional team.

Further success in the shortest format meant the Ireland team also qualified for the 2009, 2010, 2012, 2014, 2016 and 2021 World Twenty20 competitions. Ireland also secured their spot in 2022's T20 World Cup with a victory over Oman in qualifying match on 22nd February 2022.  

Before attaining Test status, Ireland also played first-class international cricket in the ICC Intercontinental Cup, which they have won four times between 2005 and 2013. Due to their successes in the first-class ICC Intercontinental Cup competition, and further high profile wins at the World Cups of 2011 (England) and 2015 (West Indies and Zimbabwe), they were labelled the "leading Associate" and stated their intention to become a full member by 2020. This intention was realised in June 2017, when the ICC unanimously decided to award Ireland and Afghanistan Full Member status, which allows them to participate in Test matches.

History

Early history

Cricket was introduced to Ireland by the English in the towns of Kilkenny and Ballinasloe in the early 19th century. In the 1830s, the game began to spread; many of the clubs which were founded in the following 30 years are still in existence today. The first Irish national team played in 1855 against The Gentlemen of England in Dublin. In the 1850s, the Englishman Charles Lawrence was responsible for developing the game in Ireland through his coaching. In the 1850s and 1860s, Ireland was visited for the first time by touring professional teams. Ireland's first match against Marylebone Cricket Club (the M.C.C.) was in 1858.

The game gained popularity until the early 1880s. The land war in the 1880s resulting from the Irish Land Commission and a ban on playing "foreign" games, in practice, British, by the Gaelic Athletic Association set back the spread of cricket. The ban was lifted in 1970, and before then anyone playing foreign games,  such as cricket was banned from the Irish games such as hurling and Gaelic football. Irish teams toured Canada and the US in 1879, 1888, 1892, and 1909. On top of this, Ireland defeated a touring South African side in 1904. Their first match with first-class status was played on 19 May 1902 against a London County side including W.G. Grace. The Irish, captained by Sir Tim O'Brien, won convincingly by 238 runs.

Before 1993
After the 1902 tour of England, where four matches yielded one win, two draws and one loss, Ireland did not play first-class cricket again for five years. Although the team had lost to the South Africans in 1894 – Ireland's first match against a Test-playing nation – Ireland defeated South Africa in 1904; it was the team's first victory against a Test side. In 1909, the first annual first-class match between Ireland and Scotland was held, and an annual match against the MCC was arranged from 1924 onwards.

The Irish played yearly first-class matches with the Scots, only interrupted by world wars, until 1999, but all their other cricket depended upon touring international sides finding it convenient to include a visit to Ireland in their schedules. However, Ireland sometimes surprised Test nations on these occasions, beating the West Indies by 60 runs in a three-day match in Dublin in 1928, for example; it was Ireland's first match against the West Indies. In 1969, in a match played at Sion Mills in County Tyrone, the team defeated a West Indian side including Clive Lloyd and Clyde Walcott by nine wickets, after bowling them out for 25. This was the last time Ireland defeated a touring side until 2003, when they beat Zimbabwe by ten wickets.

The Scots and the Irish were mostly competing with Sri Lanka for the title as the best non-Test nation at the time – indeed, Ireland drew with Sri Lanka in a rain-hit first-class match in 1979, Ireland scoring a total of 341 for 7 in two innings, while Sri Lanka made 288 for 6 in one innings. Ireland, along with Scotland and the Netherlands, has at times played in competitions for English county cricket sides, including the Benson & Hedges Cup and the Friends Provident Trophy (previously the C&G Trophy). Since there is no nationality restriction in county cricket, non-Irish people were allowed to compete for Ireland in these matches. For example, Hansie Cronje of South Africa played for Ireland in 1997, as did New Zealander Jesse Ryder in 2007.

Associate Member (1993–2007)
Ireland joined the ICC as an Associate Member in 1993, a year before Scotland. This meant Ireland could play in the ICC Trophy for the first time in 1994, and they finished seventh in the tournament. Three years later they progressed to the semi-finals of the competition but lost the third place play-off with Scotland, thus missing a place at the 1999 cricket World Cup. Ireland finished eighth in the 2001 tournament. After this, Adrian Birrell was hired as coach.

With the introduction of the ICC Intercontinental Cup in 2004, Ireland had a chance to play first-class on a regular basis. After failing to progress beyond the group stages in the 2004 competition, Ireland won their first Cup title in October 2005 with a six-wicket win over Kenya. The 2005 ICC Trophy, which was hosted in Ireland – the group stages in Belfast, Northern Ireland, the final stages in Dublin, Republic of Ireland – saw the Irish make the final, which they lost to Scotland. Though Ireland were runners-up, they had secured their place at the 2007 World Cup as well as an extra $500,000 over the next four years from the ICC to encourage development of Irish cricket. They also gained official ODI status.

Ireland's inaugural ODI was played in front of a full house of 7,500 spectators at Stormont, Belfast, on 13 June 2006 against England. It was the first time Ireland had played the full England side. Though Ireland lost by 38 runs, they were praised by Andrew Strauss, England's stand-in captain.

August saw them participate in Division One of the European Championship, against Denmark, Italy, the Netherlands and Scotland. The games against the Netherlands and Scotland had ODI status. In the tournament, and what was the team's second ODI, Ireland recorded their first ODI win, beating fellow Associates Scotland by 85 runs after man-of-the-match Eoin Morgan made 99. Although the match against the Netherlands was a no-result, Ireland won the European Championship title. Ireland's second Intercontinental Cup title came in the 2006–2007 competition. They faced Canada in the final and won by an innings and 115 runs, the four-day match concluding within two days. This made Ireland the first team to successfully defend the Continental Cup.

For the 2006 season, the C&G Trophy was reorganised to include a round-robin stage instead of being entirely knock-out. Whereas Ireland had only one match guaranteed in the tournament before, they now had more fixtures against English county sides. Ireland recorded one win in their nine matches. Ireland participated in the competition until it was restructured again in 2009. In that time they played 25 matches and won two. The latter of those victories was against Worcestershire; in that match Ireland bowled Worcestershire out for 58, which was their lowest ever one-day total. It was the first time that Ireland had bowled out a county for less than 100. Ireland were invited to participate in the reformatted competition from 2010 onwards, but chose not to do so, and instead focused their limited financial resources on international cricket.

One-Day International status (2007–present)
At the start of 2007, Ireland saw more than three months of almost constant cricket. First was a visit to Kenya, where they took part in Division One of the ICC World Cricket League. They finished fifth in the league after four narrow defeats, and Kenya won the league. Before the World Cup, the team participated in a high-performance camp in South Africa. Ireland's performance in their inaugural World Cup in the 2007 Cricket World Cup took many pundits by surprise. In their first game, on 15 March, they tied with Zimbabwe, primarily thanks to Ireland's first ever World Cup century by man-of-the-match Jeremy Bray and economical bowling in the final overs by Trent Johnston and Andre Botha. In their second match, played on Saint Patrick's Day, they beat the fourth-ranked team in the world, Pakistan, by three wickets, thus knocking Pakistan out of the competition. 

These two results were enough to advance Ireland to the Super 8 stage of the tournament. In their final group stage game, the West Indies beat them by eight wickets. In the Super 8 stage, they lost their five matches against England, South Africa, New Zealand, Australia, and Sri Lanka, but recorded a 74-run victory against Test playing nation Bangladesh, the 9th ranked team in the world. The team received a heroes' welcome in Dublin.

After the World Cup, former West Indies cricketer Phil Simmons took over the role of coach from Birrell. India were scheduled to play South Africa in a series of One Day Internationals in Ireland in June 2007. Ireland also played one-off matches at Stormont against the two teams. Missing several players from their World Cup squad, Ireland lost both games. Ireland hosted a quadrangular tournament in Dublin and Belfast in July involving the West Indies, the Netherlands, and Scotland. Ireland and the West Indies both won their games against Scotland and the Netherlands with their direct encounter ending in no result due to rain. The West Indies won the tournament because of a bonus point won against the Netherlands. Trent Johnston stepped down as captain and was replaced by William Porterfield in March 2008.

The 2007–08 ICC Intercontinental Cup began in June, with Ireland playing their first match in August. In November 2008, the team's campaign ended. After finishing second in the round-robin stage of the competition, Ireland faced Namibia in the final. Ireland won by nine wickets, securing their third consecutive Intercontinental Cup title. In March 2008 Ireland toured Bangladesh, playing three ODIs against the hosts and losing all of them. In July, Ireland played a tri-series against New Zealand and Scotland in Aberdeen but lost both matches.

Reigning champions Ireland hosted the European Cricket Championship (Division One) in late July and they won their third European title, winning every match, including the decisive encounter against Scotland by seven wickets. In early August, Ireland hosted five other Associate nations at the 2009 ICC World Twenty20 Qualifier in Belfast; this was Ireland's Twenty20 International debut. Ireland would have faced the Netherlands in the final, however the match was rained off and the teams shared the trophy. By getting to the final of the tournament, Ireland qualified for the 2009 ICC World Twenty20 in England in June 2009. Later in August, Ireland were due to play three ODIs at home against Kenya. Ireland won the first game, the second game could not be finished due to rain and the last match was completely washed out. In October, the team visited Kenya for a tri-series of ODIs with the hosts and Zimbabwe. Only two of Ireland's four games in the round-robin stage could be played, the others were rained off. Ireland lost their first match to Zimbabwe, but won their second against Kenya, though they failed to qualify for the final.

In the run-up to the 2009 ICC World Twenty20, Ireland were deprived of batsman Eoin Morgan, similarly to Ed Joyce several years earlier, who was selected to play for England, making him ineligible to play for Ireland again. Ireland played their first Twenty20 International against a full ICC member side on 8 June 2009 and in their opening match of the tournament defeated Bangladesh by four wickets and knocked them out of the tournament. Ireland progressed to the second stage of the competition. They were grouped with New Zealand, Pakistan and Sri Lanka and lost all three of their matches. In 2009, Ireland played nine ODIs, winning the seven they played against Associate nations, losing their only match against a Test team (England), and one match was abandoned.

Ireland played 17 One Day Internationals in 2010, winning 11 (including a victory over Bangladesh) and losing six. Ireland were knocked out of the 2010 ICC World Twenty20, hosted by South Africa in April and May, after being beaten by the West Indies and a washed out match against England.

The 2011 Cricket World Cup was held between February and March and hosted by Bangladesh, India and Sri Lanka. Though Ireland did not progress beyond the first round they secured a historic victory against England. Ireland beat England by 3 wickets with Kevin O'Brien hitting the fastest century in World Cup history, managing the feat in just 50 balls. In passing England's total of 327 for victory, Ireland broke the record for the highest successful run chase in the World Cup.

Shortly after the tournament ended, the ICC announced that the World Cups in 2015 and 2019 would contain ten teams; the Associate countries, who were most likely to miss out in a tournament with fewer teams strongly objected, and, led by Ireland, urged the ICC to reconsider. In June the decision was reversed. After the World Cup Ireland played Pakistan, England, and Scotland in ODIs but lost each match. A further ODI against Sri Lanka was rained off. In all, Ireland played 12 ODIs in 2011, winning four.

Ireland qualified for the 2015 Cricket World Cup, and were promoted to the ICC ODI Championship, leaving the World Cricket League, but not the ICC Intercontinental Cup. In their first match of the World Cup, Ireland defeated the West Indies by 4 wickets, chasing down 304 runs with 25 balls to spare. 

In their second match they beat the United Arab Emirates by two wickets with four balls to spare; the target was 279. Out of only five successful World Cup chases of 300 runs or more, Ireland have provided three.

In July 2016, Ireland played in its first five-match ODI series against Afghanistan which ended 2–2 with the first ODI being washed out. In September, Ireland toured South Africa for a one match ODI series against Australia and the hosts but lost both games. At the ICC's board meeting in October, Ireland was awarded first-class status for its domestic competition, the Inter-Provincial Championship.
In May 2017, Ireland travelled to England to play a two-match ODI series for the first time, though they ended up losing both games.

Test status (2017–present)
In January 2012 Cricket Ireland chief executive Warren Deutrom publicly declared Ireland's ambition to play Test cricket by 2020. Their desire to achieve Test status was in part to stem the tide of Irish players using residency rules to switch to England for the opportunity to play Test cricket. Deutrom outlined the ambition as he unveiled the new strategic plan for Irish cricket to 2015. The plan set out a series of stretching goals including increasing the number of participants in the game to 50,000, setting a target of reaching 8th in the World rankings, establishing a domestic first-class cricket structure, and reinforcing cricket as the fifth most popular team sport in Ireland.

Deutrom had already sent a letter to the ICC in 2009 stating his board's intention to apply for Full Membership – a potential pathway to Test cricket – and to seek clarification on the process. Former Australian bowler Jason Gillespie said that if Ireland got Test status it "would be huge news in world cricket, and it would be a massive positive story for the world game". Following Ireland's victory over the West Indies in the 2015 Cricket World Cup, former fast bowler Michael Holding said that the International Cricket Council should grant Ireland Test status immediately, saying "they need to be recognised now". The ICC said in 2015 that Ireland would be granted Test status in 2019 should they win the 2015–17 ICC Intercontinental Cup and beat the 10th ranked Test nation in a four-match Test series in 2018.

However, on 22 June 2017, after more than a decade of playing top-class international cricket, full ICC membership was granted to Ireland (along with Afghanistan) at an ICC meeting in London, thus making them the eleventh Test cricket team. In October 2017, the ICC announced that Ireland's first Test match would be at home against Pakistan in May 2018. Ireland played their first 'touring' Test in India in March 2019 against fellow newcomers Afghanistan, where they lost by 7 wickets.  This was followed by a four-day Test match against England at Lord's in July 2019. According to the ICC Future Tours Programme for 2019–23, Ireland are scheduled to play sixteen Tests, but along with Afghanistan and Zimbabwe, are not included in the first two editions of the ICC World Test Championship.

Ireland played England in a four-day Test match at Lord's in July 2019:{{Two-innings cricket match|date=24-27 July 2019|score-team2-inns2=38 (15.4 overs)|notes=Jason Roy, Olly Stone (Eng) and Mark Adair (Ire) all made their Test debuts.
Boyd Rankin (Ire) became the first cricketer since the Nawab of Pataudi in 1946 to play for and against England in Tests.
Tim Murtagh took the first five-wicket haul by a bowler for Ireland in Tests.
England's first innings was their shortest in a Test match at home, in terms of overs.
Jonny Bairstow (Eng) and Gary Wilson (Ire) failed to score any runs in the match. It was the first instance of both designated wicket-keepers being dismissed for a pair in a completed Test.
Ireland's second innings total was the lowest in Tests at Lord's, the seventh-lowest in Test cricket, and the lowest since South Africa were dismissed for 36 runs in the first innings of the fifth Test in Melbourne in 1932.|toss=England won the toss and elected to bat|motm=Jack Leach (Eng)|umpires=Aleem Dar (Pak) and Ruchira Palliyaguruge (SL)|venue=Lord's, London|result=England won by 143 runs|wickets-team2-inns2=Chris Woakes 6/17 (7.4 overs)|runs-team2-inns2=James McCollum 11 (17)|wickets-team1-inns2=Stuart Thompson 3/44 (12.5 overs)|team1=|runs-team1-inns2=Jack Leach 92 (162)|score-team1-inns2=303 (77.5 overs)|wickets-team2-inns1=Sam Curran 3/28 (10 overs)|runs-team2-inns1=Andrew Balbirnie 55 (69)|score-team2-inns1=207 (58.2 overs)|wickets-team1-inns1=Tim Murtagh 5/13 (9 overs)|runs-team1-inns1=Joe Denly 23 (28)|score-team1-inns1=85 (23.4 overs)|team2=|report=Scorecard}}

In October 2019, Andrew Balbirnie was appointed Test and ODI captain and one month later, in November he also took over the captaincy of T20I from Gary Wilson, thus becoming all format captain for Ireland.

On 16 January 2022, Ireland claimed their first away ODI series win over a fellow Test nation by beating the West Indies by two wickets at Sabina Park in Jamaica.

International grounds

Governing body

The Irish Cricket Union (ICU) – the governing body of Irish cricket – was officially founded in 1923, although its predecessor had been active since 1890. In common with a number of other Ireland sporting governing bodies, the Union was formed to represent cricket throughout the island of Ireland, rather than just the Republic of Ireland. In common with its counterparts for rugby union, rugby league and field hockey, the Union therefore does not use the Irish tricolor, but instead employs its own flag, which is used by such bodies as the International Cricket Council to represent the team and in ICC tournaments; "Ireland's Call" is used as the national anthem.International Cricket Council official site 

In 2007, the ICU announced major changes to bring it into line with the main cricket governing bodies. After the World Cup, Irish cricket had poor results in the 2007 Friends Provident Trophy, as many players were unavailable. The Irish cricket team was an amateur side and most of the players had full-time jobs with commitments conflicting with cricket.

Warren Deutrom, the chief executive of the ICU, has stated that it wants to "seek actively to place Irish players into top-level cricket, by developing relationships with [especially] county cricket which will incorporate appropriate player release for Irish international duty, and feeder systems for developing Irish cricketers". The reorganised ICU sought closer links with the English county teams, to encourage the development of age group cricket, and to introduce a professional element into the Irish game. They also want to take the Ireland cricket team on winter tours more often.

In an attempt to prevent the game losing players to counties or other commitments such as jobs, it was suggested that central contracts should be introduced. This was done in June 2009, with the first two going to Trent Johnston and Alex Cusack. The number of full-time contracts was expanded to six in January 2010 with support for a further nine players; the contracts were split into three categories. In January 2012 the number of contracts was increased to 23, and coach Phil Simmons highlighted the process of becoming professional as an important factor in the team's success.

Team colours
In Test matches, Ireland wears cricket whites, with the optional sweater or vest with a green v-neck with the Cricket Ireland logo on the centre. The shirts feature the Cricket Ireland logo on the right breast, the manufacturer logo on the sleeve and the sponsor logo on the left breast. The fielders wear a navy blue cricket cap or a white sunhat with the Cricket Ireland logo. The batsman helmets are coloured similarly. In limited-overs cricket, Ireland wears an emerald green (in ODI) or lawn green (in T20) uniform with dark blue and white accents and feature the Cricket Ireland logo on the right breast, the sponsor logo on the centre and the manufacturer logo on the left breast. The fielders wear a dark blue baseball-style cap or sunhat. Dark blue, sometimes referred to as 'presidential blue', taken from both the Irish Presidential seal and the Irish quarter of the British Royal coat of arms, is historically considered a secondary national colour of Ireland, and frequently appears along with green on the kit of all-island teams e.g. hockey and rugby union.
In ICC-regulated tournaments, the sponsor logo goes to the non-leading arm sleeve, making space for the inscription "IRELAND" written in white, on the centre section of the shirt.
The sponsor is CoinDCX and the manufacturer is O'Neills.

Tournament history
World Cup

T20 World Cup

Other tournaments

‡ Only the matches between Scotland, Ireland and the Netherlands in the 2006 tournament have official ODI status.

European Annual Tri-Series (T20I)

Ireland Tri-Nation Series (ODI)

Oman Quadrangular Series (T20I)

Current squad
This lists all the active players who have played for Ireland in the past year (since 25 April 2022) and the forms in which they have played, or any players (in italics) outside this criteria who have been selected in the team's most recent squad. In addition, it includes all 19 players contracted by Cricket Ireland in March 2022, apart from Peter Chase and William Porterfield  who retired from international cricket in May 2022.

Key
S/N = Shirt number
C/G = Contract grade
F/T = Full-time contract
R = Retainer contract
E = Education contract

Coaching staff

Coaching history
1995–1999:  Mike Hendrick
1999–2001:  Ken Rutherford
2002–2007:  Adrian Birrell
2007–2015:  Phil Simmons
2015–2017:  John Bracewell
2017–2021:  Graham Ford
2021–2022:  David Ripley (interim)
2022–present:  Heinrich Malan

Records
International match summary – IrelandLast updated 18 March 2023.Test matches

Highest team score: 339 v. Pakistan, 11 May 2018 at The Village, Malahide.
Best innings bowling: 5/13, Tim Murtagh v. England on 24 July 2019 at Lord's, London.
Record partnership score: 118, Kevin O'Brien v. Pakistan on 11 May 2018 at The Village, Malahide.

Most Test runs for Ireland

Most Test wickets for Ireland

Bold – still playing for Ireland

Test record versus other nationsRecords complete to Test #2352. Last updated 26 July 2019.One-Day Internationals

Highest team score: 359/9 v. New Zealand, 15 July 2022 at ICC Academy Ground, Dublin.
Best innings bowling: 6/55, Paul Stirling v. Afghanistan on 17 March 2017 at Greater Noida Sports Complex Ground, Greater Noida.
Record partnership score: 227 by William Porterfield & Kevin O'Brien v. Kenya, Nairobi, 2 February 2007

Most ODI runs for Ireland

Most ODI wickets for Ireland

Highest ODI scores for Ireland

Bold – still playing for Ireland

ODI record versus other nationsRecords complete to ODI #4539. Last updated 18 March 2023.Twenty20 Internationals

Highest team score: 225/7 v. Afghanistan, 30 Nov 2013 at Sheikh Zayed Cricket Stadium, Abu Dhabi
Best innings bowling: 4/11, Alex Cusack v. West Indies, 21 February 2014 at Sabina Park, Jamaica

Most T20I runs for Ireland

Most T20I wickets for Ireland

Highest T20I scores for Ireland

Bold – still playing for Ireland

T20I record versus other nationsRecords complete to T20I #1989. Last updated 15 January 2023.''

First-class
Highest team total: 589/7 declared v. UAE, 13 March 2013, ICC Intercontinental Cup match at Sharjah, UAE

Most first-class runs

Most first-class wickets

Highest individual innings

Note: Ivan Anderson's 198* v. Canada was in a non-first-class match

See also

 Cricket in Ireland
 Irish national cricket captains
 Ireland under-19 cricket team
 Irish women's cricket team
 List of Ireland ODI cricketers
 List of Ireland T20I cricketers
 List of Ireland Twenty20 International records

Notes

References

Further reading

External links

Official website of Ireland cricket team
Cricket Europe Ireland Page

 	

National cricket teams
Ireland in international cricket
C